Hantu Bongkok or Bès Bungkok female type Nenek Bongkok is mythological bloodthirsty creature/ghost/evil spirit predating the colonial era in Palembang, South Sumatra, translates Humpback spirit.

References

External links
 (Twitter) As featured in GeGeGe no Kitarō animation/tv cartoon series

Indonesian legendary creatures